The 1984 Nagano earthquake hit the western part of Nagano Prefecture, Japan on September 14, 1984, at 08:48 local time (September 13, 1984, at 23:48 UTC). Registering a magnitude of  6.3, the earthquake destroyed Otaki (Japanese: 王滝(おうたき)), and triggered major landslides. The earthquake left at least 29 people dead or missing, making it the deadliest earthquake in 1984.

Geology 

Relation to other earthquakes 
Seismologists including Akeo Yoshida state that the 1948 Fukui earthquake, a 7.0  earthquake in Gifu Prefecture, a 6.6  earthquake in Gifu Prefecture in 1969, and this earthquake were earthquakes that occurred in a cycle for a little while in the same area.

Main shock 
Since there was no seismometer in the area, the Japan Meteorological Agency made an estimate intensity, Shindo 6. Some unofficial estimates put it to Shindo 7. There are reports that rocks and pieces of wood flew in the air in areas near the epicenter, due to ground accelerations faster than gravitational acceleration in the 5 Hz~10 Hz shaking range.

Damage 

Due to torrential rains in the area before the earthquake, many landslides occurred.

Incidents 
A nearby valley was completely buried under  of earth. The four people in the facility's owner's family and five people who were looking for mushrooms in the area were also buried and became missing.
 A large landslide in the Matsugoe District caused part of an inn and a road to collapse and crash into a concrete factory on the bottom of the slope, killing 13 people working in the forest and the factory. There were no people staying at the inn, and the owner miraculously survived since she was able to stay on her tatami mat and rode the landslide as it swept down. She was able to climb up the cliff caused by the landslide, even though she was badly injured. She was found and hospitalized for 2 weeks.
 A house in the Takigoe District collapsed after a landslide crashed into it, killing one person.
 Five people who were driving in the Kōrigase District were buried in a landslide and became missing. Two people were able to survive by running away from the landslide.
 One person became missing in the Yanagigase District.
 A man driving a truck was killed after being swept away by a landslide.
 A lake was formed after a landslide blocked a river.

Precursors 
 According to Nagoya University, hot spring observatories near the epicenter recorded a big difference in the ratio of Methane and Argon, and the amount of Hydrogen before the earthquake. The change in the amount of Hydrogen is thought to be from small rupturing before the main earthquake.
 A change in the percentage of Radon was observed at 141 observatories over 3 faults, including the Japan Median Tectonic Line.

Response 
Nine check dams were built on Mount Ontake in four years after the earthquake.

See also 
 1948 Fukui earthquake

References

External links

Nagano earthquake
Nagano earthquake
Nagano earthquake 1984
Nagano earthquake
Nagano earthquake
Earthquakes of the Showa period
Nagano earthquake